Springfield Municipal Airport  is a city-owned, public-use airport located one nautical mile (2 km) north of the central business district of Springfield, a city in Bon Homme County, South Dakota, United States. It is included in the National Plan of Integrated Airport Systems for 2011–2015, which categorized it as a general aviation facility.

On August 10, 2019, the airport was renamed Springfield Municipal Airport, Lindeman Field, after Theodore Lindeman, a South Dakota native and WWII Navy pilot.

Facilities and aircraft 
Springfield Municipal Airport covers an area of 136 acres (55 ha) at an elevation of 1,324 feet (404 m) above mean sea level. It has two runways: 15/33 is 3,500 by 60 feet (1,067 x 18 m) with an asphalt surface and 1/19 is 1,900 by 100 feet (579 x 30 m) with a turf surface.

For the 12-month period ending September 29, 2011, the airport had 4,166 aircraft operations, an average of 11 per day: 99.9% general aviation and 0.1% air taxi. At that time there were 13 aircraft based at this airport: 92% single-engine and 8% helicopter.

References

External links 
 Airport page at City of Springfield website
 Springfield (Y03) at South Dakota DOT Airport Directory
 Aerial image as of September 1991 from USGS The National Map
 

Airports in South Dakota
Transportation in Bon Homme County, South Dakota